Thomas Haydock (24 July 1890 – 2 September 1918) was a Scottish amateur football centre half who played in the Scottish Football League for Queen's Park.

Personal life 
Haydock was a graduate of Glasgow University and was a travelling salesman for the Clydevale Oil & Colour Company, Bridgeton. In September 1914, one month after the outbreak of the First World War, Haydock enlisted in the Queen's Own Cameron Highlanders. In January 1915, he was commissioned as a second lieutenant in the Cameronians (Scottish Rifles). Haydock saw action at Gallipoli and Palestine, before being seriously wounded during an attack on Umbrella Hill during the Third Battle of Gaza on 1 November 1917. He did not return to his battalion until August 1918, after it had been deployed on the Western Front. Haydock was wounded during an attack on the Hindenburg Line, west of Quéant on 2 September 1918 and died the same day at a Casualty Clearing Station in Bailleulval. He was buried in Bac-du-Sud British Cemetery, Bailleulval.

Career statistics

References 

Scottish footballers
1918 deaths
British Army personnel of World War I
British military personnel killed in World War I
Queen's Own Cameron Highlanders soldiers
Scottish Football League players
Queen's Park F.C. players
Footballers from Glasgow
Cameronians officers
Association football wing halves
1890 births
Alumni of the University of Glasgow
People from Bridgeton, Glasgow